The Lungotevere dei Mellini is the stretch of Lungotevere that links Via Vittoria Colonna to Piazza della Libertà, in the rione Prati in Rome (Italy).

The Lungotevere takes its name from the Mellini (or Millini) family, which owned a house in the rione Monti and another in Piazza Navona; it was established as per resolution dated July 20, 1887.

From the Lungotevere is it possible to observe the back façade of Palazzo Blumenstihl, easily recognizable for the big arches in the ground floor and for the turret. The palace rises in the same place of the former Teatro Alhambra, built in 1880 and destroyed by a fire in 1902; the theatre, interely made of wood, was very popular for its Opera performances. Since 1992 Palazzo Blumenstihl  houses the Polish Institute in Rome.

Notes

Bibliografia 

Mellini
Streets in Rome R. XXII Prati